Gerard Cowley-Tuioti (born Gerard Tuioti-Mariner; June 16, 1992) is a New Zealand rugby union player who currently plays as a lock for Kobelco Kobe Steelers in Japan Rugby League One.

Early career
Raised in Auckland, he was initially schooled at Massey High School but later attended Kelston Boys' High School and helped its team reach the semi-finals of their 1A competition in 2010.

Senior career

He became a regular starter the following year, playing 10 times and then played a significant role in Harbour's successful 2016 campaign which saw them promoted from the Championship to the Premiership for 2017. Cowley-Tuioti played in all 12 games during the season, 11 of them from the start, and scored 1 try.

Super Rugby

After just a season and a half's experience at national provincial championship level, Cowley-Tuioti was named in the  squad  ahead of the 2016 Super Rugby season.   The step up proved a tough one and he could only muster a solitary appearance from the replacements bench against the  during his debut campaign at that level.   Despite this, his continued good form at domestic level with North Harbour ensured that Blues coach Tana Umaga retained him in his squad for 2017.

Cowley-Tuioti joined the Kobelco Kobe Steelers for the 2022 Japan Rugby League One season

Career Honours

North Harbour

Mitre 10 Cup Championship - 2016

Super Rugby Statistics

References

1992 births
Living people
New Zealand rugby union players
Rugby union locks
Blues (Super Rugby) players
North Harbour rugby union players
People educated at Massey High School
People educated at Kelston Boys' High School
Rugby union players from Auckland
Moana Pasifika players
Kobelco Kobe Steelers players